Mahanayak Uttam Kumar, formerly Tollygunge, is a station of the Kolkata Metro. The station is located in Tollygunge area.
 The station has been named after Uttam Kumar, one of the most famous names of Indian Bengali Cinema.

The Tollygunge Golf Club is on the west side of the station, the Royal Calcutta Golf Club lies less than a kilometre to the east and ITC Sangeet Research Academy is a short distance south along Deshapran Sashmal Road at Netaji Subash Chandra Bose Road.

Station Layout

It is an at-grade station of the Kolkata Metro Line 1.

Connections

Bus
Bus route number 12C/1B, 40A, 40B, 41, 41B, 47/1, 80A, 205, 205A, 208, 228, SD5, S112 (Mini), S113 (Mini), S114 (Mini), S117 (Mini), S188 (Mini), C8, C14/1, M7B, M16, M16A, M18, S2, S4C, S6A, S7, S17A, S31, AC4B, AC6, AC16, AC31, AC47, V1, V9, ST6 etc. serve the station.

Tram
Tram route number 24/29 serves the station.

See also

Kolkata
List of Kolkata Metro stations
Transport in Kolkata
Kolkata Metro Rail Corporation
Kolkata Suburban Railway
Kolkata Monorail
Trams in Kolkata
Garia
Tollygunge
E.M. Bypass
List of rapid transit systems
List of metro systems

References

External links
 
 
 Official Website for line 1
 UrbanRail.Net – descriptions of all metro systems in the world, each with a schematic map showing all stations.

Kolkata Metro stations
Railway stations in Kolkata
Railway stations opened in 1984